John Russell Welchli (March 6, 1929 – March 23, 2018) was an American rower. He was a member of the U.S. Olympic Rowing Team at the 1956 Summer Olympics, Melbourne, Australia. Welchli rowing out of the Detroit Boat Club won a silver medal at the 1956 Olympics in the four without coxswain event along with DBC teammates James McIntosh and identical twin brothers John McKinlay and Art McKinlay. In 1956 the Detroit Boat Club coached by Walter M. Hoover placed seven oarsman on the US Olympic Rowing Team winning 2 silver medals the other being in the double sculls event crewed by Pat Costello and James Gardiner. The seventh member of the 1956 team was alternate Walter Hoover Jr.The seven 1956 Detroit Boat Club Olympic oarsman are known as the "DBC Seven."  Welchli also won a combined 32 Canadian and U.S. national gold medals during his distinguished career. Welchli was a Master Senior Sculler competing up until 2010 and is considered one of the all-time great American scullers.

Welchli was nominated in 1996 as a Michiganian of the Year by the Detroit Free Press. Wechli was a graduate of the University of Michigan School of Business. He was born in Detroit, Michigan.

References

External links
 The Detroit News
 

1929 births
2018 deaths
American male rowers
Taft School alumni
Brown University alumni
Ross School of Business alumni
Rowers at the 1956 Summer Olympics
Olympic silver medalists for the United States in rowing
Medalists at the 1956 Summer Olympics
Rowers from Detroit